Flaveria pubescens is a rare Mexican plant species of Flaveria within the family Asteraceae. It has been found only in the States of Tamaulipas and San Luis Potosí in northeastern Mexico.

One plant can produce numerous flower heads in a loose branching array. Each head contains 10-15 yellow disc flowers but no ray flowers.

References

External links 
photo of herbarium specimen at Missouri Botanical Garden, collected in San Luis Potosí in 1904, isotype of Flaveria pubescens

pubescens
Endemic flora of Mexico
Flora of Northeastern Mexico
Plants described in 1915